Vitali Ledenev (born 26 March 1979) is a retired Belarusian professional footballer who recently started a football agent career.

Career
Born in Minsk, Lyadzyanyow played professionally in the Belarusian Premier League and Liga Leumit. He scored four goals in 16 appearances for Maccabi Ahi Nazareth F.C. during 2008.

In January 2011, he joined Olimpia Elbląg on a one-year contract.

Lyadzyanyow played for the Belarus national under-21 football team from 1996 to 1999.

Honours
Dinamo Minsk
Belarusian Premier League champion: 2004
Belarusian Cup winner: 2002–03

Dacia Chișinău
Moldovan National Division champion: 2010–11

References

External links
 

1979 births
Living people
Belarusian expatriate footballers
Belarusian expatriate sportspeople in Armenia
Belarusian expatriate sportspeople in Azerbaijan
Belarusian expatriate sportspeople in Israel
Belarusian expatriate sportspeople in Moldova
Belarusian expatriate sportspeople in Poland
Belarusian footballers
Expatriate footballers in Armenia
Expatriate footballers in Azerbaijan
Expatriate footballers in Israel
Expatriate footballers in Moldova
Expatriate footballers in Poland
FC Dinamo-Juni Minsk players
FC Dinamo Minsk players
FC Torpedo Minsk players
FC Slavia Mozyr players
Maccabi Netanya F.C. players
Hapoel Haifa F.C. players
FC Belshina Bobruisk players
FK MKT Araz players
FC Veras Nesvizh players
Maccabi Ahi Nazareth F.C. players
FC Urartu players
FC Partizan Minsk players
Shamakhi FK players
Ulisses FC players
FC Dacia Chișinău players
Olimpia Elbląg players
FC Gorodeya players
Belarusian Premier League players
Armenian Premier League players
Israeli Premier League players
Liga Leumit players
Association football forwards